Marius Szőke (born 21 January 1993) is a Romanian handballer who plays as a centre back for Steaua Alexandrion București and the Romania national team.

References

1993 births
Living people
People from Sfântu Gheorghe
Romanian male handball players
CSA Steaua București (handball) players
Romanian sportspeople of Hungarian descent